The island country of Tonga has five administrative divisions. Each of these is further divided into districts, 23 in total. Below are several lists of the divisions, according to different sorting schemes. The Niua Islands is managed directly from Nuku’alofa, since the population is under 1500 people.

Administrative subdivisions

By Districts

Notes
Minerva Reefs is generally considered to be a part of Tonga. It has never formed part of any administrative subdivision or district of Tonga.

Area stats
The districts of Tonga have the following statistical info: 
the average size of a district is 31.7 km2, while the median area is 0.0 km2. the size of these districts is predominantly dependent on the land area of the islands they occupy.

Population stats
The districts of Tonga have the following statistical info: 
The average district population is 4,500, while the median is 0.

According to official data from the 2011 Tonga we had over 20 cities with a population in excess of 200 inhabitants. The country's capital Nuku'alofa is the only city had a population of over 20000 residents; 2 city with a population of 1 ÷ 5 thousand. and the rest of the cities of less than 1000. residents.

Sources :
 Tonga Data 1
 Tonga Data 2
 Tonga Data 3
 Tonga Data 4
 Daily Telegraph Tongan island for sale

See also
ISO 3166-2:TO
List of cities in Tonga

References

 
Tonga
Tonga